Ayana Zholdas (born 9 June 2001) is a Kazakhstani freestyle skier. She competed in the 2018 Winter Olympics.

References

2001 births
Living people
Freestyle skiers at the 2018 Winter Olympics
Kazakhstani female freestyle skiers
Olympic freestyle skiers of Kazakhstan
21st-century Kazakhstani women